Bruce Arnold Ackerman (born August 19, 1943) is an American constitutional law scholar.  He is a Sterling Professor at Yale Law School. In 2010, he was named by Foreign Policy magazine to its list of top global thinkers. Ackerman was also among the unranked bottom 40 in the 2020 Prospect list of the top 50 thinkers for the COVID-19 era.

Biography
Ackerman was born on August 19, 1943. He graduated from the Bronx High School of Science and received a Bachelor of Arts degree from Harvard University in 1964 as well as a Bachelor of Laws degree from Yale Law School in 1967. He clerked for U.S. Court of Appeals Judge Henry J. Friendly from 1967 to 1968, and then for U.S. Supreme Court Justice John Marshall Harlan II from 1968 to 1969.

Ackerman joined the faculty of University of Pennsylvania Law School in 1969.  He was a professor at Yale University from 1974 to 1982 and at Columbia University from 1982 to 1987.  Since 1987 Ackerman has been the Sterling Professor of Law and Political Science at Yale.  He teaches classes at Yale on the concepts of justice and on his theories of constitutional transformation (i.e., the Constitution of the Founders was transformed by the Civil War/Reconstruction and the New Deal).  His wife, Susan Rose-Ackerman, is also a professor at Yale Law School who teaches classes on administrative law.  Their son, John M. Ackerman, is also an academic who lives and works in Mexico.  Their daughter, Sybil Ackerman-Munson is an environmentalist in Portland, Oregon. He was elected a Fellow of the American Academy of Arts and Sciences in 1986. He is also a Commander of the Order of Merit of the French Republic.

Ackerman is listed as counsel in U.S. Army Captain Nathan Michael Smith's lawsuit against President Barack Obama.  The lawsuit asserts five counts against the President: that Operation Inherent Resolve violates the War Powers Resolution, that the Constitution's Take Care Clause requires the President to publish a sustained legal justification of his actions, that the Authorization for Use of Military Force Against Terrorists does not authorize the operation against ISIS, that the Iraq Resolution does not authorize the operation in Iraq, and that the Commander in Chief clause does not allow the President to authorize the operation.  Captain Smith's attorneys allege he has standing to sue because he will be personally liable for any damages he inflicts in an illegal war.  The White House responded that the lawsuit raises "legitimate questions".  After the district court dismissed the lawsuit as a political question, Ackerman appealed.

Criticism of judicial review
Sandrine Baume identified Bruce Ackerman as a leading critic of the "compatibility of judicial review with the very principles of democracy," in contrast to writers like John Hart Ely and Ronald Dworkin. For his position as documented by Baume, Ackerman was joined in his opinion about judicial review by Larry Kramer and Mark Tushnet as the main proponents of the idea that judicial review should be strongly limited and that the Constitution should be returned "to the people."

That reading by Baume of Ackerman fails to account for Ackerman's many arguments for judicial review in a democratic constitution, such as his Storrs Lecture, when he noted that judicial review "is part of a larger theme that distinguishes the American Constitution from other, less durable, frameworks for liberal democracy."  As one of three principles of the economy of virtue, Ackerman sees a constitutional design for judicial review "that gives judges special incentives to uphold the integrity of earlier constitutional solutions against the pulling and hauling of normal politics." Ackerman has refined his approach but still asserts, "I refuse to join in the general retreat from judicial review that characterizes the contemporary work of many liberal constitutionalists."

Works
He is the author of fifteen books and more than eighty articles. His interests cover constitutional theory, political philosophy, comparative law and politics, law and economics, American constitutional history, the environment, modern economy and social justice.

His works include:
 1980: Social Justice in the Liberal State
 1991: We the People, Volume 1, Foundations
 1995: Is NAFTA Constitutional?, with David Golove
 1998: We the People, Volume 2, Transformations
 1999: The Stakeholder Society, with Anne Alstott
 2002: Voting with Dollars, with Ian Ayres
 2005: The Failure of the Founding Fathers
 2006: Before the Next Attack: Preserving Civil Liberties in an Age of Terrorism
 2010: The Decline and Fall of the American Republic
 2014: We the People, Volume 3: The Civil Rights Revolution
 2018: Revolutionary Constitutions: Charismatic Leadership and the Rule of Law

We the People: Foundations is best known for its forceful argument that the "switch in time", whereby a particular member of the US Supreme Court changed his judicial philosophy to one that permitted much more of the New Deal legislation in response to the so-called court-packing plan, is an example of political determination of constitutional meaning.  Ackerman delivered the 2006 Oliver Wendell Holmes Lectures at Harvard Law School.

The Stakeholder Society served as a basis for the introduction of Child Trust Funds in the United Kingdom.

University of Tehran held a conference in May 2019, about Revolutionary Constitutions: Charismatic Leadership and the Rule of Law with Ackerman and Maftouni as keynote speakers. Maftouni also wrote a review on the book which was published in The Socratic Inquiry newsletter and an analytical paper about some parts of the book which was published in Journal of Contemporary Research on Islamic Revolution.

See also

 Asset-based egalitarianism
 List of law clerks of the Supreme Court of the United States (Seat 9)

References

External links 
 Bruce Ackerman's Profile at Yale Law School
 

Law clerks of the Supreme Court of the United States
American legal scholars
American political philosophers
Columbia University faculty
Harvard University alumni
University of Pennsylvania Law School faculty
Yale Law School alumni
Yale Law School faculty
Yale Sterling Professors
1943 births
Living people
American scholars of constitutional law
Scholars of comparative law
Fellows of the American Academy of Arts and Sciences
The Bronx High School of Science alumni